Marques Bragg (born March 24, 1970) is a retired American professional basketball player who played in the NBA with the Minnesota Timberwolves.

Bragg was a Providence Friar in college, and co-led the Big East Conference in Field goal percentage with Dikembe Mutombo in 1991. He went undrafted out of college, but played in 53 games with the Timberwolves in the 1995–96 season (averaging 2.5 PPG and 1.5 RPG in 7.0 minutes).

External links
NBA stats at databasebasketball.com

1970 births
Living people
American expatriate basketball people in Brazil
American expatriate basketball people in France
American expatriate basketball people in Italy
American expatriate basketball people in Spain
American expatriate basketball people in Turkey
American men's basketball players
Basketball players from New Jersey
Basket Rimini Crabs players
BCM Gravelines players
Club Ourense Baloncesto players
Darüşşafaka Basketbol players
Grand Rapids Mackers players
Liga ACB players
Minnesota Timberwolves players
Power forwards (basketball)
Providence Friars men's basketball players
SIG Basket players
Sportspeople from East Orange, New Jersey
Undrafted National Basketball Association players
Valencia Basket players
American expatriate basketball people in the Philippines
Alaska Aces (PBA) players
Philippine Basketball Association imports
Pop Cola Panthers players